Dylan Cantrell (born June 29, 1994) is an American football tight end that is currently a free agent. He played college football at Texas Tech and was drafted by the Los Angeles Chargers as a wide receiver in the sixth round of the 2018 NFL Draft.

College career
Cantrell was a four-star recruit coming out of high school. He chose Texas Tech over Arkansas, West Virginia, Ole Miss, and Mississippi State.

In his freshman year, Cantrell played in 11 games with 9 receptions for 70 yards and 1 touchdown.

For his sophomore year, Cantrell played in all 12 games with 20 receptions for 312 yards and 2 touchdowns.

Cantrell was redshirted for the 2015 season due to a back injury.

Despite missing two games due to injury, Dylan Cantrell had a breakout season his junior year. Cantrell played in 10 games with 57 receptions for 669 yards with 8 touchdowns.

Cantrell built on the success of his junior year during his senior year. Cantrell played in all 13 games for the Red Raiders with 71 receptions for 816 yards with 7 touchdowns. Cantrell also had one rushing attempt for 3 yards that resulted in a touchdown.

Statistics

Professional career

Los Angeles Chargers
Cantrell was drafted by the Los Angeles Chargers as a wide receiver in the sixth round (191st overall) of the 2018 NFL Draft. He was waived on September 1, 2018, and was signed to the practice squad the next day. He was promoted to the active roster on December 3, 2018.

On July 28, 2019, Cantrell was waived/injured by the Chargers and placed on injured reserve the next day, where he remained for the entire season. At the start of the 2020 league year in March, Cantrell became a free agent when the Chargers elected not to tender him as an exclusive-rights free agent.

Arizona Cardinals
On June 1, 2020, Cantrell was signed by the Arizona Cardinals with the intentions of switching to tight end. On September 5, 2020, Cantrell was waived during final roster cuts, and re-signed to the practice squad a day later. He was released two days later.

New England Patriots
On November 10, 2020, the New England Patriots signed Cantrell to their practice squad. He was released on November 13.

Washington Football Team
On December 23, 2020, Cantrell was signed to the Washington Football Team's practice squad. He signed a reserve/futures contract with the team on January 11, 2021. He was waived/injured on June 3, 2021, and subsequently reverted to the team's injured reserve list the next day.

References

External links
Texas Tech Red Raiders bio

1994 births
Living people
American football wide receivers
Arizona Cardinals players
Los Angeles Chargers players
New England Patriots players
People from Whitehouse, Texas
Players of American football from Texas
Texas Tech Red Raiders football players
Washington Football Team players